Skariah Thomas (31 March 1943 – 18 March 2021) was an Indian politician, a veteran leader of Kerala congress and a former member of Loksabha from Kottayam during 1977–1984. He was the chairman of Kerala Congress (Skaria Thomas) faction group from 2015.

Biography
He was the chairman of Kerala Congress (Skaria Thomas), which is one among several factions of the Kerala Congress. He was a member of the 6th and 7th Lok Sabha of India. He represented the Kottayam constituency of Kerala. He was in office from 1977 to 1984. He died on 18 March 2021 in Kochi due to post-COVID-19 complications.

Private life
Skariah Thomas was the son of KT Skaria and Achamma. He was married to Lalitha and the couple have 3 daughters 
Nirmala, Anitha, Latha and a son Sakariya.

References

1943 births
2021 deaths
Kerala Congress (M) politicians
Indian politicians
Deaths from the COVID-19 pandemic in India
India MPs 1977–1979
India MPs 1980–1984
People from Kottayam district